Abramelin may refer to:
The Book of Abramelin, a famous 15th century grimoire
Abramelin oil, anointing oil mentioned within the book; popular in the 20th century largely due to occultists Samuel Mathers and Aleister Crowley
Abramelin (band), an Australian death metal band
Abramelin (album), the band's self-titled debut album